Deh Now-e Sofla (also Romanized as Deh Now-e Soflá; also known as Deh Now, Dehnow-e Pā’īn, and Deh Now-e Pā’īn) is a village in Shaban Rural District, in the Central District of Nahavand County, Hamadan Province, Iran. At the 2006 census, its population was 471, in 119 families.

References 

Populated places in Nahavand County